The following is an episode list of the Rick Green show, History Bites, which ran from 1998 to 2004.

Episodes

Season One

Season Two

Season Three

Season Four

Season Five

Timeline
This is a list of episodes arranged chronologically.

1900 AD – 1300 AD

1300 AD – 6000 BC 

Lists of Canadian television series episodes
Lists of comedy television series episodes